The Suicide Squad was an association football hooligan firm linked to Burnley Football Club. The self-imposed title is derived from previous behaviour at away games where the single-minded involvement in violence against overwhelming odds could be described as suicidal. The name became synonymous with the group during the early 1980s.

The Suicide Squad officially disbanded in 2011 when 12 members of the squad received prison sentences totalling 32 years, following a high-profile incident with local rivals Blackburn Rovers in 2009.

The firm had longstanding rivalries with fans of Blackburn Rovers, Millwall, Plymouth Argyle, Preston North End, Stoke City, and Bolton Wanderers.

History
Out of the terrace wars of the 1980s emerged a gang known as the Suicide Squad in a period which also saw Burnley F.C.'s fall from the First Division to the Fourth Division and the threat of non-league football. This meant that the calculated, disciplined, organised operation that struck fear into opposing fans clashed with many rival mobs in the country and became world-renowned as one of the fiercest and most dangerous in Britain.

Although partially disbanded, a new more menacing group began to emerge. This group, considerably younger, named themselves the Burnley Youth. They remained associated with the Suicide Squad, but refused to abide by the rules of the game. This group were more determined and less affected by the police tactics, than their older colleagues. The police began to receive intelligence reports from members of the Suicide Squad who were genuinely concerned that their younger brethren were "out of control" and were travelling to away matches with weapons. The level of violence and the circumstances surrounding these incidents strongly supported these concerns.

In November 2002, Burnley police and the football club jointly established Operation Fixture, a scheme aimed at tackling football hooliganism in and around the club's stadium, Turf Moor, with more bans, more arrests and quicker convictions. The scheme also aimed to target racists, with the example of a Burnley fan having given a Nazi salute during a League Cup match against Tottenham Hotspur.

On 7 December 2002, a 17-year-old Nottingham Forest fan was killed when Burnley supporters attacked Forest fans in Burnley town centre. Two days later, a 19-year-old Burnley fan, Andrew McNee, a member of the so-called Suicide Youth Squad was arrested and charged with murder. He was sentenced to seven years in youth custody after he pleaded guilty to manslaughter in July 2003. He was also banned from football matches for ten years. When passing sentence, the trial judge commented that the attack had happened, "for absolutely no reason, other than he supported a different football team and had the temerity to visit a public house the defendant and others believed he should have kept away from"; adding that football hooliganism was a "scourge on the sport" and said the courts should make it clear that anyone involved in violence would face harsh sentences. McNee was released from prison in 2006. Within weeks however, he was fined £200 after pleading guilty to breaching his ten-year football banning order. On 22 July 2006, police caught him outside Turf Moor when Burnley played Bolton Wanderers, Burnley's first home game since McNee had been released from prison.

In July 2007, one of the founding members of the Suicide Squad, Andrew Porter, who wrote a book about his exploits with the firm, was coming to the end of a three-year ban from attending both England and domestic matches. However, Burnley police applied for a fresh banning order with the start of the new season only weeks away under Operation Fixture which had been introduced in 2002.

In May 2009, another founder member of the Suicide Squad, Philip Holmes, was banned for a further three years from English and Welsh football grounds. The ban follows a steady stream of incidents since Holmes' original ban expired in February 2007, including being the central figure in games against Stoke City and Sheffield United in the 2008–09 season.

The Suicide Squad featured in the television documentary series The Real Football Factories which was first shown on the Bravo television channel.

On 18 October 2009, following the first Premier League derby between Blackburn Rovers and Burnley, members of the Suicide Squad clashed at the Station public house in the Cherry Tree area of the town in a riot described by police officers as "like something out of Braveheart". In January 2011, 12 members of the Suicide Squad received prison sentences totalling 32 years along with lengthy banning orders. Andrew Porter was discovered to have organised the riot, receiving the heaviest sentence; a five-year prison sentence along with a ten-year banning order. Porter had written a book — Suicide Squad: The Inside Story of a Football Firm — about his experiences as a football hooligan.

References

Further reading
 Porter, Andrew (2005). Suicide Squad: The Inside Story of a Football Firm, Milo Books, 

Burnley F.C.
British football hooligan firms
1983 establishments in England
Gangs in England